In the political terminology of the former Soviet Union, the socialist-leaning countries were the post-colonial Third World countries which the Soviet Union recognized as adhering to the ideas of socialism in the Marxist–Leninist understanding. As a result, these countries received significant economic and military support. In Soviet press, these states were also called "countries on the path of the construction of socialism" and "countries on the path of the socialist development". All these terms meant to draw a distinction from the true socialist states (in Marxist–Leninist understanding).

The use of the term was partly a result of a reassessment of national liberation movements in the Third World following World War II, widespread decolonization and the emergence of the Non-Aligned Movement as well as Nikita Khrushchev's Secret Speech to the 20th Congress of the Communist Party of the Soviet Union and the de-Stalinization of Soviet Marxism. The discussion of anti-colonial struggle at the 2nd World Congress of the Comintern in 1920 had been formulated in terms of a debate between those for an alliance with the anti-imperialist national bourgeoisie (initially advocated by Vladimir Lenin) and those for a pure class line of socialist, anti-feudal as well as anti-imperialist struggle (such as M. N. Roy). The revolutions of the post-war decolonization era (excepting those led by explicitly proletarian forces such as the Vietnamese Revolution), e.g. the rise of Nasserism, were initially seen by many communists as a new form of bourgeois nationalism and there were often sharp conflicts between communists and nationalists. However, the adoption of leftist economic programs (such as nationalization and/or land reform) by many of these movements and governments, as well as the international alliances between the revolutionary nationalists and the Soviet Union, obliged communists to reassess their nature. These movements were now seen as neither classical bourgeois nationalists nor socialist per se, but rather offering the possibility of "non-capitalist development" as a path of "transition to socialism". At various times, these states included Algeria, Angola, Central African Republic, Egypt, Ethiopia, India, Libya, Mozambique, South Yemen and many others.

In Soviet political science, "socialist orientation" was defined to be an initial period of the development in countries which rejected capitalism, but did not yet have the prerequisites for the socialist revolution or development. Along these lines, a more cautious synonym was used, namely "countries on the path of non-capitalist development". A 1986 Soviet reference book on Africa claimed that about one-third of African states followed this path.

In some countries designated as socialist-leaning by the Soviet Union such as India, this formulation was sharply criticized by emerging Maoist or Chinese-leaning groups such as the Communist Party of India (Marxist), who considered the doctrine class collaborationist as part of the larger Sino-Soviet split and the Maoist struggle against so-called Soviet revisionism.

List of socialist-leaning states 

Some of these countries had communist governments while others (italicized) did not.
  (1952–1973)
  (1955–1961, 1963–1991)
  (1958-1963, 1968-1991)
  (1958–1978)
  (1960–1991)
  Somali Democratic Republic (1969–1977)
  (1962–1991)
  (1962–1988)
  (1968–1979)
  (1964–1985)
  (1964-1991)
  (1960–1966)
  (1968–1975)
  (1969–1972)
  (1969–1991)
  People's Republic of the Congo (1969–1991)
  (1970–1973)
  (1972–1980)
  (1975–1991)
  (1975–1991)
  South Yemen (1967–1990)
  (1969–1971) 
  (1959–1966)
  (1947-1991)
  People's Republic of Bangladesh (1971–1975)
  Democratic Republic of Madagascar (1972–1991)
  Guinea Bissau (1973–1991)
  Derg (1974–1987)
  People's Democratic Republic of Ethiopia (1987–1991)
  (1975–1991)
  People's Republic of Benin (1975–1990)
  People's Republic of Mozambique (1975–1990)
  People's Republic of Angola (1975–1991)
  (1976-1991)
  Seychelles (1977–1991)
  Democratic Republic of Afghanistan (1978–1991)
  People's Revolutionary Government of Grenada (1979–1983)
  (1979–1990)
  People's Republic of Kampuchea (1979–1989)
  (1980–1991) 
  (1983–1987) 
  (1948–1953, 1991) 
  (1944–1949)

See also 

 African socialism
 Arab socialism
 Bureaucratic collectivism
 Communist state
 Congress of the Peoples of the East
 Developmentalism
 List of socialist states
 Marxism–Leninism
 New class
 Nomenklatura
 People's republic
 Politics of the Soviet Union
 Socialist state
 Soviet Bloc
 Soviet Empire
 State capitalism
 State socialism

Notes

References 

Communism
Marxism–Leninism
Politics of the Soviet Union
Socialism
Socialist states